Sergeant John Herbert Hall was an English First World War flying ace, credited with five aerial victories.

He served in No. 22 Squadron RAF, flying as an observer/gunner in the Bristol F.2b. His first two victories came on 5 June 1918, shooting down an Albatros D.V in the morning and a Pfalz D.III in the evening, with pilot Lieutenant John Everard Gurdon. On 9 July, flying with Lieutenant T. W. Martin, he accounted for two Albatros D.Vs, and then a Fokker D.VII on 27 August. Hall was awarded the Décoration Militaire by Belgium in February 1919.

References

Year of birth missing
Year of death missing
People from Leeds
Royal Flying Corps soldiers
British World War I flying aces
Military personnel from Yorkshire
19th-century births